Glyphipterix rhinoceropa is a species of sedge moth in the genus Glyphipterix. It was described by Edward Meyrick in 1935. It is found in southern China.

References

Moths described in 1935
Glyphipterigidae
Moths of Asia